A Good Little Devil is a 1914 silent film starring Mary Pickford, produced by Adolph Zukor and Daniel Frohman, and distributed on a 'State's Rights' basis. It was Pickford's first feature-length film.

She, along with friend Lillian Gish, appeared in the 1913 Broadway play version of the story prior to the film being made. Much of the cast of the play appeared in the film version. This film is essentially lost, with only one of the five reels surviving, along with a five-second clip in the 1931 film The House That Shadows Built.

Cast

Mary Pickford - Juliet
Ernest Truex - Charles MacLance
William Norris - Mrs. MacMiche
Iva Merlin - Betsy
Wilda Bennett - Queen Mab
Arthur Hill - Rab, the dog
Edward Connelly - Old Nick, Sr.
Etienne Girardot - Old Nick, Jr.
Ernest Lawford - A Poet
David Belasco - himself
Paul Kelly - unknown role (unbilled)

See also
The House That Shadows Built (1931 promotional film by Paramount)

References

External links
 
 

1914 films
American silent feature films
American films based on plays
Films directed by Edwin S. Porter
Lost American films
1914 drama films
Silent American drama films
American black-and-white films
1914 lost films
Lost drama films
1910s American films